Saint-Leu Airfield was a military airfield in Algeria, near the city of Bettioua, about 45 km northeast of Oran.

During World War II it was used by the United States Army Air Force Twelfth Air Force 319th Bombardment Group during the North African Campaign against the German Afrika Korps.  The 319th flew B-26 Marauder medium bombers from the airfield between 11 and 18 November 1942.

References

 Maurer, Maurer. Air Force Combat Units of World War II. Maxwell AFB, Alabama: Office of Air Force History, 1983. .

External links

Airfields of the United States Army Air Forces in Algeria
World War II airfields in Algeria
Airports established in 1942
1942 establishments in Algeria
1943 disestablishments in Algeria